Lost River may refer to:

Communities
In Australia:
 Lost River, New South Wales

In Canada:
Lost River, Quebec, part of Harrington, Quebec
Rural Municipality of Lost River No. 313, Saskatchewan

In the United States:
Lost River, Idaho
Lost River, Indiana
Lost River Township, Martin County, Indiana
Lost River, Kentucky
Lost River, West Virginia

Rivers
Any losing stream, a river that decreases in volume as it flows
In the United States:
Lost River (Alaska), four different rivers
Lost River (Bering Sea)
A tributary to the Nowitna River
Lost River (California), in California and Oregon
Big Lost River, Idaho
Little Lost River, Idaho
Lost River (Indiana)
In Minnesota (listed by tributary):
Lost River (Clearwater River)
Lost River (Nett Lake)
Lost River (Roseau River)
Lost River (Tamarac River)
Lost River (Thief River)
Lost River (New Hampshire)
Lost River (Washington), a tributary to the Methow River
Lost River (Cacapon River), in West Virginia

Other
 Lost River (film), a 2014 American film directed by Ryan Gosling
The Lost River, 2014 book by Michel Danino subtitled On The Trail of the Sarasvati
Lost River Cave, Kentucky
Lost River Caverns, Pennsylvania
Lost River State Forest, Minnesota
Lost River Athletic Conference, a 1970s high school conference in Indiana
Lost River Jr./Sr. High School, serving Merrill, Oregon

See also 
 Lost (disambiguation)